Dam safety systems are used to monitor the state of dams, including external physical threats to the dams, and issuing emergency warnings at various degrees of automation. This includes the use of differential GPS and SAR remote sensing to monitor the risks imposed by landslides and subsidence. For large dams, seismographs are used to detect reservoir-induced seismicity that could threaten the stability of the dam. The output of these systems can provide warning to the local population ahead of a potential collapse.

Particular applications

Ukraine
The monitoring and warning system safeguarding the Kiev Reservoir dam is complicated enough to include protection from a space object impact.

Italy
The dam monitoring system of Enel green Power  in the Riolunato Dam controls all of the dam's important parameters.
Optical and physical alignment systems are installed to control any movement of the land under and around the dam.
The dam monitoring system checks the level of the water because this creates different pressures on the dam, also in relation to the air and water temperature. 
All these parameters are controlled and compared with the deformation and stress applied on the structure of the dam, measured with extensimeter, pendulum, reverse pendulum, piezometer, etc.
The dam monitoring system continuously stores and analyzes all the dam parameters, creating 5 typologies of alarms.
The dam monitoring system sets different levels of alarms corresponding to specific risks, like a reduction of lake water levels, and communicates risks with a network of all dam control systems.
When the level of risk increases, the monitoring system activates alarms to close roads or bridges, and eventually alerts people living in nearby villages.
All data is continuously sent from the dam monitoring system to the network dam control system, where specialist engineers can make decisions regarding the emergency situation.
The Riolunato dam monitoring local system software is developed from AuCo Solutions.

United States
Dam safety systems became a focus of multi-agency regulations during the U.S. Army Corps of Engineers  construction of large flood control and hydro-electric power generation projects. To help benchmark proven practices, the Association of State Dam Safety Officials (ASDSO) formed a national non-profit organization of state and federal dam safety regulators, dam owners and operators, engineering consultants, manufacturers and suppliers, academia, contractors and others interested in dams safety. More recently public safety concerns were addressed by the Indian Dams Safety Act of 1992 during hearings before the Select Committee on Indian Affairs, United States Senate, 102nd Congress, second session, on S. 2617. The purpose was to provide for the maintenance of dams located on Indian lands in New Mexico by the Bureau of Indian Affairs through contracts with the Indian tribes. (August 4, 1992 in Washington, D.C.)

The ASDSO Conference Proceedings paper by Gary R. Holtzhausen (1991) describes the effective use of tiltmeters with remote sensing to provide reliable low-cost early warning of impending structural failures.

The ASDSO Conference Proceedings paper by Barry K. Meyers (2002) describes two case studies using failure modes analysis together with a variety of automated instrumentation to provide early warnings at White River Project owned by Puget Sound Energy as well as a case study of the Silver Creek Dam near Silverton OR.

See also
 Threat of the Dnieper reservoirs
 Operation Chastise
 Expert system
 Reservoir safety

References

Further reading
 Association of State Dam Safety Officials (ASDSO) 1991 Annual Conference Proceedings: 29 September - 2 October 1991 at San Diego, California. Holzhausen, Gary R. - Applied Geomechanics, Inc. Low-Cost, Automated Detection of Precursors to Dam Failure: Coolidge Dam, Arizona (pp. 281–284)
 Dam Safety: Know the Potenatial Hazards (Federal Emergency Management Agency Booklet L152 / Sept 1989)
 Federal Guidelines for Dam Safety - June 25,] 1979 (GPO: 041-001-00187-5)
 Guidelines for Instrumentation and Measurements for Monitoring Dam Performance, American Society of Civil Engineers, 2000, 712 pages, .

External links
 ASDSO; Association of Dam Safety Officials
 DamSafety: Commercial comprehensive approach to Dam Safety
 Dam Smart: Commercial Off-The-Shelf (COTS) solutions
 Earth Won International Commission on Large Dams
 MCEER: Multidisciplinary Center for Earthquake Engineering Research
 MoDNR: Natural Disaster Resources (14 December 2005 Dam Failure)
 Comprehensive Survey of Missouri's Dam Safety Law
 Dam Anchor Cable Fault Detection
 Geomation, Inc.; Automated Systems and Telemetry for Dam Safety Monitoring

Disaster preparedness
Emergency Alert System
Dams